The Saturday Show Live is a British television programme presented by Gaby Roslin and Matt Allwright which was broadcast live on Channel 5 on Saturday mornings.

Presenters

Guest presenters

Reporters
Craig Stevens (Showbiz news)
Stacey Solomon (Correspondent)
David Domoney (Gardening)
Joe Inglis (Pets)
Pollyanna Woodward (Gadgets)

Episode guide

Series 1 (2015–2016)

Series 2 (2016)

References

External links

2010s British television talk shows
2015 British television series debuts
2016 British television series endings
Channel 5 (British TV channel) original programming
Television series by Endemol
English-language television shows